The Trail Beyond is a 1934 Western film directed by Robert N. Bradbury and starring John Wayne, Noah Beery Sr., and Noah Beery Jr. The motion picture was based on the novel The Wolf Hunters by James Oliver Curwood, which was also adapted as a silent film (1926) and a later sound film (1949), both called The Wolf Hunters.

Stunning location backgrounds filmed around Mammoth Lakes, California, set this film firmly apart from most of the other Poverty Row westerns shot during the decade in which Wayne found himself trapped between his screen masterpieces The Big Trail (1930) and Stagecoach (1939).

Cast
 John Wayne as Rod Drew
 Verna Hillie as Felice Newsome
 Noah Beery Sr. as George Newsome 
 Noah Beery Jr. as Wabi
 Robert Frazer as Jules LaRocque
 Iris Lancaster as Marie LaFleur
 James A. Marcus as Felice's uncle 
 Eddie Parker as Ryan, the Mountie
 Earl Dwire as Henchman Benoit

See also
 John Wayne filmography
 List of American films of 1934

External links
 
 
 

1934 films
American black-and-white films
1930s English-language films
Films directed by Robert N. Bradbury
1934 Western (genre) films
Monogram Pictures films
Films based on American novels
American Western (genre) films
Northern (genre) films
Films shot in California
1934 drama films
Films based on novels by James Oliver Curwood
Royal Canadian Mounted Police in fiction
1930s American films